This list of Delta Upsilon brothers includes notable members of Delta Upsilon fraternity who were regularly pledged and initiated through an undergraduate chapter of the  fraternity. It does not list honorary members, who include George W. Atherton, Aubrey Radcliffe, and Justin Smith Morrill. Also not listed is Dave Frohnmayer, initiated as a regular member by the University of Oregon chapter of Delta Upsilon in 2001 at the age of 61. (Frohnmayer's father was a member of the fraternity; however, the Harvard chapter of Delta Upsilon had seceded prior to Dave Frohnmayer's arrival at that school as an undergraduate in the 1960s, precluding him the opportunity for regular pledging and initiation.)

The nationality of each of the members listed here is indicated by flag icons for the United States, Canada, United Kingdom, Colombia, Sweden, Ethiopia, and Japan. Three persons in the following list - Charles Dawes, Charles Evans Hughes, and John Arthur Clark - have served as the international president of Delta Upsilon fraternity.

Aviation

Business

Diplomacy

Education

Film and television

Government

Journalism

Literature

Military

Music

Religion

Science

Sports

References

External links
 Noel "Paul Stookey" (Michigan State) performing "Blowing in the Wind" at the Washington Peace March
 Kurt Vonnegut, Jr. (Cornell) interviewed about Cat's Cradle
 Juan Manuel Santos (Kansas) receives a pass-in-review from the Colombian police and armed forces (in Spanish)
 Alan Thicke (Western Ontario) interviewed on the Katie Couric Show about son Robin
 Joseph Kennedy's (Harvard) 1940 farewell address
 Lester Pearson (Toronto) speaks to the 1968 Liberal Party convention

brothers
Lists of members of United States student societies